Wall$treet (Börsenfieber in German) is a 1989 video game published by Magic Bytes.

Gameplay
Wall$treet is a game in which a series of reports and telexes prompt players to make stock purchases and sales.

Reception

Brian Walker reviewed Wall Street for Games International magazine, and gave it a rating of 1 out of 10 (a turkey), and stated that "It might be better as a multi player game but it's doubtful. As it stands, Wall Street is merely an unusual way of finding out if you have a future as a speed typist."

Brian Carroll for Game Player's PC Strategy Guide reviewed the game and said that "Wall$treet is fairly complex, presenting a market that reacts to events, dividend expenditures, borrowing, and the fluttering fortunes of the game's players."

Reviews
Amiga Joker

References

External links
Wall Street at Retro Games

1989 video games
Amiga games
Atari ST games
Business simulation games
Commodore 64 games
DOS games
Magic Bytes games